Chloropterus lefevrei is a species of leaf beetle distributed from the Caucasus via Central Asia to Western Asia. It was first described by Edmund Reitter in 1890, who named it after Édouard Lefèvre.

Subspecies
There are two subspecies of C. lefevrei:
 Chloropterus lefevrei arabicus Lopatin, 2008: Found in the United Arab Emirates.
 Chloropterus lefevrei lefevrei Reitter, 1890: The nominotypical subspecies. Found in Azerbaijan, Iran, Iraq, Kazakhstan, Oman, Saudi Arabia, Tajikistan, Turkmenistan and Uzbekistan.

References

Eumolpinae
Beetles of Asia
Insects of Central Asia
Insects of Western Asia
Insects of the Arabian Peninsula
Taxa named by Edmund Reitter
Beetles described in 1890